Mashiro, a feminine Japanese given name and a Japanese surname, may refer to:
, Japanese VTuber affiliated with Nijisanji
, Japanese synchronized swimmer
, Japanese professional wrestler
, Japanese singer signed to Sacra Music
 Mashiro Kazahana, a character in the Japanese anime series My-HiME and My-Otome
 Mashiro Kuna, a character in the Japanese manga and anime series Bleach
 Mashiro Kurata, a character in BanG Dream!
 Mashiro Mitsumine, a brown-haired monster from the Japanese four-panel manga Mikakunin de Shinkoukei
 Mashiro Shiina, a character in the Japanese light novel series The Pet Girl of Sakurasou
 Moritaka Mashiro, a character in the Japanese manga series Bakuman
 Rima Mashiro, a character in the Japanese manga series Shugo Chara!

Japanese feminine given names
Japanese-language surnames